Geoff Knorr (born 13 June 1985) is an American composer, orchestrator, and sound designer.  He has worked on video game titles such as Civilization V, Civilization: Beyond Earth, Civilization VI, Galactic Civilizations III, and Ashes of the Singularity.   

Knorr was born in Framingham, Massachusetts and grew up in Marietta, Georgia.  He took piano and cello lessons at a young age and he composed his first piece of music in eighth grade. He studied composition with Christopher Theofanidis and Michael Hersch and recording arts and sciences at the Peabody Institute of the Johns Hopkins University in Baltimore, Maryland.

Knorr first came to the attention of the Firaxis sound team when he did score preparation for the choir recording for Civilization IV: Beyond the Sword. He has since collaborated as a composer, orchestrator, and sound designer with Firaxis Games and Stardock.


Works

Awards and nominations 
ASCAP Morton Gould Young Composer Award, 2004
NACUSA Young Composers Competition, Honorable Mention, 2007
Salvatore Martirano Memorial Composition Award, Honorable Mention 2009
Minnesota Orchestra Composer Institute, Participant, 2009

References

External links
 Official Website of Geoff Knorr
 

1985 births
Living people
American classical composers
Video game composers
Peabody Institute alumni
People from Framingham, Massachusetts
People from Marietta, Georgia